Doppler is a lunar impact crater named for Christian Doppler that is located at the southern edge of the walled plain Korolev, on the far side of the Moon. To the east are the craters Das and Galois. Farther to the southwest of Doppler is Mohorovičić.

The rim of Doppler has a somewhat polygonal form, and a smaller crater is joined with the inner side of the northeast wall. The interior of Doppler is rough and irregular, with some terracing of the worn outer walls, and a complex of central hills to the north of the midpoint. The crater Doppler B lies within the northern rim, and occupies a portion of the northern floor. A small, crater-formed valley runs to the southeast across the floor of Doppler from the rim of Doppler B.

Satellite craters
By convention these features are identified on lunar maps by placing the letter on the side of the crater midpoint that is closest to Doppler.

References

 
 
 
 
 
 
 
 
 
 
 
 

Impact craters on the Moon